Kukula is a surname. Notable people with the surname include:

 Marek Kukula (born 1969), British astronomer and author
 Thomas Kukula (born 1965), German DJ, Eurodance musician, and music producer
 Kukula (born 1993), Cape Verdean footballer